In music, a sonata is a musical piece which is played as opposed to sung.

Sonata may also refer to:

Music and arts 
Sonata form, a way of organizing the composition of a work of music
Moonlight Sonata, composition by Ludwig van Beethoven
Sonata (play), a one-act play by Indian playwright Mahesh Elkunchwar
Sonata Arctica, a Finnish power metal band
 Sonatas (film), a 1959 Mexican-Spanish historical film

People
Sonata (given name)

Television 
"Sonata" (Moonlight), a television episode
Sonata Dusk, a character in My Little Pony: Equestria Girls - Rainbow Rocks

Medicine 
Zaleplon, tradename Sonata, a very short-acting sedative used for treatment of insomnia

Computing and software 
The Sonata I, II, and III, computer cases manufactured by Antec
Sonata (software), a GTK+-based GUI for the Music Player Daemon
Sonata Software, an Indian IT consulting and software services company
Sonata (building design software), a 1980s 3D building design application
SONATA (anonymity software), Service-Oriented Netcoded Architecture for Tactical Anonymity, a next generation overlay network, building further on software like TOR (anonymity network)
Eternal Sonata, a 2007 Xbox 360 and 2008 PlayStation 3 game

Vehicles 
Hunter Sonata, a small racing and cruising yacht built by British boat builder Hunter Boats
Hyundai Sonata, a sedan automobile (saloon car) built by Hyundai Motor Company
Sonata 6.7, an American sailboat design
Sonata 8, an American sailboat design
Sonata 26, an American sailboat design

Other 
Sonata Watches, India's largest selling brand, made by Titan Industries